Lombach may refer to:

 Lombach (Agger), a river of North Rhine-Westphalia, Germany
 Lombach (Aare), a river of Switzerland, near Unterseen, tributary of Lake Thun